Manuel Vermeire (born 12 July 1987) is a Belgian printmaker whose work mainly consists in reproducing paintings in the form of wood-engravings.

Biography 
Manuel Vermeire was born in Chiusdino (Siena) on July 12, 1987, the son of Belgian parents who had moved to Italy a few years earlier.

Today, his wood-engravings follow, in the footsteps of past masters such as Timothy Cole, the tradition of reproducing famous paintings in a print version.

Awards 

 Milan, Italy: First prize in the 2018 graphic works competition “Opere su Carta” at the Circuiti Dinamici Gallery. Solo exhibition in autumn 2018.
 Torredembarra, Wood Engraving Competition: La Torre de l'Encenall, Joint First Prize winner, 2016.
 Paris, Wood Engraving Competition Jean Chièze, First Prize winner, 2015.
 Paris, Musée des Avelines: Wood Engraving Competition Jean Chièze, Honor Prize winner, 2009.
 Colle Val d’Elsa, Italy, Associazione Culturale Mino Maccari: First prize in the Concorso Mino Maccari per la Satira Grafica, July 2007.

Public and private collections 

His works are in the collection of the 'Museo dell'Incisione', Palazzo dei Paleologi, Acqui Terme, Italy; the collection of the 'Internationaal Ex-Libris Centrum Sint Niklaas' in Belgium; the collection of the 'Association Graver Maintenant', Paris; the collection of the 'Association Jean Chièze pour l'encouragement à la gravure sur bois', Paris; the collection of the Museum Florean (Engraving Salon Carbunari) in Baia Mare, Romania; the collection of the 'American Society of Bookplate Collectors and Designers' in San Antonio, Texas; the collection of the 'Asociaciòn Mexicana de Exlibris'; the collection of the Miejska Galeria Sztuki in Lódz (Poland).

His works are in private collections in Belgium, France, Italy, Ireland, Australia, Russia, the Czech Republic and the United States

References

External links
http://thewoodengraver.blogspot.com

1987 births
Living people
Belgian printmakers
Belgian wood engravers
Belgian engravers
People from the Province of Siena
Belgian expatriates in Italy